The United States Air Force's 219th Electronics Engineering and Radar Installation Squadron (219th EIS) is a communications infrastructure engineering Air National Guard squadron located at Tulsa International Airport in Tulsa, Oklahoma. The mission of the 219th EIS is to support the warfighter by engineering, installing and maintaining global C4 systems. It adds value to the country by responding to national, state and local emergencies.
The 219th Radar Section has been crucial during DoD projects involving the Air Force's Over the Horizon Backskatter Radar and Air Force Research Labs projects in New York, Ohio, and Massachusetts.

Lineage
 Constituted as the 11th AACS Installation and Maintenance Squadron and allotted to the Air Force Reserves
 Activated on 18 June 1954
 Redesignated as 11th AACS Engineering and Installation Squadron on 15 July 1958
 Redesignated as 11th GEEIA Squadron on 1 January 1959
 Withdrawn from the Air Force Reserve, allotted to the Air National Guard, and redesignated 219th GEEIA Squadron on 1 October 1960
 Redesignated 219th Electronics Installation Squadron on 1 May 1970
 Redesignated 219th Engineering and Installation Squadron ca. 1 July 1981

Assignments
 2472d Air Reserve Flying Center, 18 June 1954
 2694th Air Reserve Center, 18 July 1958
 Oklahoma Air National Guard, 1 October 1960

Gaining Command
 Airways and Air Communications Service, 18 June 1954
 Ground Electronics Engineering and Installation Agency, 1 January 1959
 Air Force Communications Service (Later Air Force Communications Command), 1 May 1970
 Air Force Space Command, unknown

Stations
Tinker Air Force Base, Oklahoma 18 June 1954
 Will Rogers World Airport, Oklahoma, 1 October 1960
Tulsa International Airport, Oklahoma, 1982 – Present)

References

External links

Military units and formations established in 1954
Squadrons of the United States Air National Guard
Military units and formations in Oklahoma